Ram Pothineni (born 15 May 1988) is an Indian actor who primarily works in Telugu films. He made his acting debut with the box office success Devadasu (2006), for which he won Filmfare Award for Best Male Debut – South. He has two Filmfare Award South and one SIIMA Awards to his credit. 

Post his debut, he starred in the commercial and critical success, Ready (2008). This was followed by a series of commercial failures, before success with Kandireega (2011). Pothineni's other notable works include Pandaga Chesko (2015), Nenu Sailaja (2016), Vunnadhi Okate Zindagi (2017), Hello Guru Prema Kosame (2018), iSmart Shankar (2019) and Red (2021).

Early life 
Ram Pothineni was born on 15 May 1988, in Hyderabad, to Murali Pothineni. He is the nephew of Telugu film producer, Sravanthi Ravi Kishore. Actor Sharwanand is his cousin. His family hails from Vijayawada, Andhra Pradesh.

Career

Debut and early career (2006–2010) 
Pothineni first appeared in Tamil language short film Adayaalam (2002) where he played an 18-year old drug addict. He then made his theatrical debut in 2006 with Devadasu. His second film, Jagadam opposite Isha Sahani was directed by Sukumar. He then appeared in Ready alongside Genelia D'Souza directed by Srinu Vaitla which was a commercial success. In 2009, he had two releases, Maska and Ganesh: Just Ganesh. In 2010, Pothineni had only one release, Rama Rama Krishna Krishna, produced by Dil Raju and directed by Srivaas.

Career ups and downs (2011–2016) 
Pothineni's next film was Kandireega (2011). Later he starred in Endukante... Premanta! (2012) alongside Tamannaah, directed by Karunakaran and produced by Sravanthi Ravi Kishore. In 2013, Pothineni appeared in Ongole Githa with Kriti Kharbanda directed by Bhaskar and produced by B.V.S.N. Prasad. In the same year, he co-starred alongside Venkatesh in the action comedy Masala, the remake of the Hindi film Bol Bachchan, directed by K. Vijaya Bhaskar and jointly produced by Sravanthi Ravi Kishore and D. Suresh Babu.

In 2015, Pothineni starred in two films, Pandaga Chesko and Shivam . While Pandaga Chesko directed by Gopichand Malineni, was a commercial success, Shivam ended up as one of the biggest failures of his career. In 2016, He had two releases, both produced by his own production house Sri Sravanthi Movies, Nenu Sailaja which was a commercial success and Santosh Srinivas-directed Hyper which was an average at the box office.

Success and recent work (2017–present) 
His 2017 coming-of-age film Vunnadhi Okate Zindagi received mixed reviews. In 2018, he starred in the romantic comedy Hello Guru Prema Kosame directed by Trinadha Rao Nakkina. In 2019, he collaborated with director Puri Jagannadh for the action thriller iSmart Shankar. Pothineni tasted success with the film after a series of flops.

His 2021 film is Red where he played a dual role, is a remake of Tamil film Thadam (2018). In 2022, he starred in the Lingusamy-directed The Warriorr where he played a police officer. The film received negative reviews from critics and was huge commercial failure.

Pothineni is signed onto star in Boyapati Srinu's #RAPO20. It will be his first pan-India film.

Media image
Pothineni has featured on Hyderabad Times Most Desirable Men list various times. He ranked 11th in 2017, 11th in 2018, 3rd in 2019 and 2nd in 2020.

Pothineni did his first ever brand endorsement for Garnier alongside John Abraham.

Filmography

As actor

All films are in Telugu, unless otherwise noted.

Other roles

Accolades

Notes

References

External links 

 

Living people
Male actors from Hyderabad, India
Telugu male actors
Indian male film actors
Male actors in Telugu cinema
21st-century Indian male actors
1988 births
Zee Cine Awards Telugu winners